Dave Duggan (born 1955, London, England) is an Irish novelist and dramatist.

Writing career
His novels are The Greening of Larry Mahon (2004), A Sudden Sun (2012), and Oak and Stone (2019). His book Related Lives: An Imagined Memoir (2016) is an unembellished retelling of the lives of the deceased members of his working-class family, drawing on imagination to fill any factual gaps.

His stage plays include Spike Dreams (2003), Bubbles in the Hot-Tub (2007), Doctor Watt's Squeezebox (2008), Still, The Blackbird Sings (2010), Makaronik (2014), Denizen (2015) and Gruagairí (2007), for which he was awarded a Stewart Parker Trust / BBC Award. He received a Major Arts Award from The Arts Council of Northern Ireland in 2010.

His work in Irish includes the novel Makaronik  (2018), the on-line drama series Comhairleoirí  (2011) and Ór agus Mil  (Cló Iar-Chonnacht, 2022).

Between 1996 and 2007, he wrote and directed plays for Sole Purpose Productions, published as Plays in a Peace Process (2008).

He also wrote the screenplay for the 1996 Oscar-nominated, live-action short film Dance Lexie Dance.

Personal life
He was born in London, the eldest child of Irish parents Eddie and Margaret (née Spillane) Duggan. The family returned to Ireland in 1963 and settled in his parents' home city of Waterford, where he attended local schools. He studied physics at University College Dublin.

Soon after graduating, he worked as a volunteer teacher for two years in the Malaysian state of Sabah on the island of Borneo, which is the setting of his first novel, The Greening of Larry Mahon. Following that, he worked as director of a volunteer programme in The Gambia for two years, where he met Diane Traynor, whom he married in 1981. They settled in Derry, Northern Ireland, where he is still based.

References 

1955 births
Living people
Irish male novelists
Irish male dramatists and playwrights
Writers from London
Alumni of University College Dublin
People from Waterford (city)
Irish screenwriters
21st-century Irish dramatists and playwrights
Irish male screenwriters
Irish expatriates in Malaysia
Writers from Derry (city)
21st-century Irish novelists
Irish expatriates in the Gambia
21st-century Irish screenwriters